Deborah Bird Rose (1946-2018) was an Australian-based ethnographer of Aboriginal peoples; plus, in her lifetime, an increasingly ecological, multi-species ethnographer and leader in multidisciplinary ethnographic research

Early years

Born in 1946, Deborah Bird Rose was the eldest of four siblings (Betsy, Mary, Martha, and Will) growing up in Seattle, Washington, Rock Springs, Wyoming, Salem, Oregon, Salem, Massachusetts, and Le Chambon-sur-Lignon, France.  By the early 1970s Rose was living in Delaware, attending the University of Delaware, where she worked as a research assistant and helped teach within the university's Department of Anthropology, in 1973 completing a Bachelor of Arts in Anthropology, with honors and distinction.

From 1973 to 1974, Rose was a coordinator of a Women's Education Collective, teaching at a Women's Resource Centre in Newark, Delaware, following which, by 1977, she was in Bryn Mawr, Pennsylvania completing a Master of Arts in anthropology at Bryn Mawr, a private women's liberal arts College., and for a brief period in 1979 lecturing in Anthropology on cultural and social change at Trenton State College, New Jersey

By 1980 Rose had enrolled in a Doctor of Philosophy at Bryn Mawr College and obtained a National Science Foundation grant to undertake research in Aboriginal Australia, taking her to Australia and to the Aboriginal Australian community of Yarralin, Northern Territory for which Rose also obtained an Australian Institute of Aboriginal Studies grant to study and research the 'cultural identity' of Aboriginal peoples at Yarralin

Ethnographic fieldwork

For a period, from September 1980 to July 1982, Rose immersed herself and conducted twenty-two months ethnographic research within the Northern Territory Aboriginal communities of Yarralin and Lingarra, actively observing and interviewing mostly Ngaringman and Ngaliwurru speakers who had otherwise lived the whole of their lives on Anglo-Australian owned cattle stations, wherein Rose participated in, photographed, and learned about these peoples' public ceremonial life, women's secret ceremonial life, and their daily life in town, and in the bush.

From this initial, immersive period of ethnographic research, Rose learns local Aboriginal peoples of the Victoria River District ".. possess their own exegesis of cosmos and humanity.." also known in Aboriginal English as 'the Dreaming', and, in 1983–84, she obtains a grant from the Australian Institute of Aboriginal Studies undertaking to write about and report on "the religious identity of the Aboriginal peoples of the Victoria river", altogether culminating in her producing, for 1984, her Bryn Mawr College Doctor of Philosophy dissertation as follows:

In 1984 Rose presents some of her doctoral findings on Yarralin peoples' religion and religious identity to an Australian Association for the Study of Religions, entitled "Consciousness and Responsibility in an Australian Aboriginal religion", being a summary paper that is later included in W.H Edwards (1987) "Traditional Aboriginal Society: A Reader" for future students of Aboriginal peoples.   Rose's ethnography, itself, eventually becomes an influential Australian anthropological book entitled "Dingo Makes Us Human: Life and Land in an Australian Aboriginal Culture" published first by Cambridge University Press in 1992, winning the Stanner Prize for a work on Aboriginal issues; next printed in 2000, with a third edition printed in 2011.

Postcolonial histories

At least one reviewer of the ethnographic work arising out of Rose's doctoral fieldwork observed, "..the author’s research is an example of [a] wave of anthropological writing, with [an] emphasis on community involvement, ownership and control.." wherein Rose herself advised:

At the same time as submitting her dissertation, in 1984, Rose submitted to publish the first of her 'Aboriginal histories learnt while undertaking her ethnographic fieldwork; this one entitled 'The Saga of Captain Cook: Morality in Aboriginal and European Law' (1984);  followed shortly afterwards with 'Ned Lives!' (1986, later reincarnated as 'Ned Kelly Died for our Sins' 1994); also  'Remembrance' (1986) plus ‘Signs of Life on a Barbarous Frontier: Intercultural Encounters in North Australia’ (1998), all published during a stint as a visiting fellow in Canberra, at the  Australian National University's History Department writing the Yarralin Aboriginal teachers' ' "Hidden Histories. Black Stories from Victoria River Downs, Humbert River, and Wave Hill stations, North Australia" (1991)

Rose also saw her Aboriginal teachers, elders, and historians Humbert Tommy Nyuwinkarri and Hobbles Danayarri formally acknowledged in the Horton's (ed) (1994) Encyclopaedia of Aboriginal Australia, also seeing Hobbles Danayarri included and acknowledged in the 1996 Northern Territory Dictionary of Biography, also in 2007, the Australian Dictionary of Biography.

Land rights

As a visiting fellow (1984-1988) with the Australian Institute of Aboriginal Studies (AIAS), whom had provided funding supporting Rose's doctoral research, Rose teamed up with archaeologist/historian Darrell Lewis:
 co-authoring a paper on ethical issues for archaeologists recommending Aboriginal consultation methodologies for archaeologists (1985); 
 collaboratively documenting and assessing the cultural significance of rock art in the Victoria River district (1987) and;
 co-writing for the AIAS a book about the rock art of the Victoria River District entitled "The Shape of the Dreaming. The cultural significance of Victoria River rock art" (1988)

Over this time Rose also teamed up with Darrell Lewis to research, write, and provide expert opinion for the following land claims under the Aboriginal Land Rights (Northern Territory) Act 1976:
 the Kidman Springs/Jasper Gorge Land Claim (1986); then
 the Bilinara (Coolibah-Wave Hill Stock Route) Land Claim (1989)

Later (1993-1998) as a fellow with the Australian National University's Darwin based North Australia Research Unit (1993-1998) Rose undertook further statutory Northern Territory land rights work, this time including writing senior anthropological reports and providing expert opinion for:
 the Kamu People, Kamu Country Land Claim (1993)
 the Kenbi (Cox Peninsula) Land Claim on behalf of the Tommy Lyons Group (1995)

Rose played a major role in the Victorian and NSW Yorta Yorta Native Title claim in the 1990s, strongly and forcefully supporting the claimants against Kennett Government intransigence.

Rose was also consulted by, and provided specialist anthropological advice to the Aboriginal Land Commissioner, Justice Peter Gray, responsible for deciding statutory land rights claims, including, for instance, in relation to the Central Mount Wedge Land Claim (1998), Palm Valley Land Claim (1999), The Alcoota Land Claim (2007), and the Wangkangurru Land Claim (2014)

Rose describes her work in this whole land rights field as follows:

Books

ROSE, Deborah Bird and Darrell LEWIS (1988) The Shape of the Dreaming: the Cultural Significance of Victoria River Rock Art. Canberra: Aboriginal Studies Press. 

 
 
ROSE, Deborah Bird, Kathy DEVEREAUX, Margaret DAIYI, Linda FORD, April BRIGHT, Sharon D'AMICO (2002) Country of the Heart: An Australian Indigenous Homeland. Canberra: Aboriginal Studies Press

Edited Books 

 ROSE, Deborah Bird, Thom van DOOREN, and Matthew CHRULEW (2017) Extinction Studies: Stories of Time, Death, and Generations. New York: Columbia University Press. 
 GIBSON, Katherine, Deborah Bird ROSE, Ruth FINCHER (2015) Manifesto for Living in the Anthropocene. New York: Punctum Books. 
 ROSE, Deborah Bird, Richard DAVIS (2006) Dislocating the Frontier: Essaying the Mystique of the Outback. Canberra: Australian National University Press. 
 ROSE, Deborah Bird and Anne CLARKE (1997) Tracking knowledge in Northern Australian landscapes: studies in indigenous and settler ecological knowledge systems. Canberra: Australian National University Press. 
 ROSE, Deborah Bird (1995) Country in flames: Proceedings of the 1994 symposium on biodiversity and fire in North Australia. Canberra: Biodiversity Unit, The Australian National University. 
 ROSE, Deborah Bird and Tony SWAIN (1988) Aboriginal Australians and Christian missions: ethnographic and historical studies Bedford Park: Australian Association for the Study of Religions. . Open Library: OL1914552M

References

External links

Publications on-line

 ROSE, Deborah Bird (1989) "Remembrance" in Aboriginal History 1989 13(2) 135-148 Accessed 3 January 2019
 ROSE, Deborah Bird (1990) 'A Distant Constellation' in Continuum: The Australian Journal of Media & Culture. Vol. 3, No. 2. Accessed 31 December 2018
 ROSE, Deborah Bird (1996) "Land Rights and Deep Colonising: the Erasure of Women" in Aboriginal Law Bulletin 69; 3(85) Accessed 3 January 2019
 ROSE, Deborah Bird (1997) "Common property regimes in Aboriginal Australia: totemism revisited" in Peter Larmour (ed) The Governance of Common Property in the Pacific Region ANU E-Press Accessed 2 January 2019
 ROSE, Deborah Bird (2001) "Aboriginal life and death in Australian settler nationhood" in Aboriginal History 2001 Vol 25 Accessed 31 December 2018
 ROSE, Deborah Bird (2005) "Rhythms, patterns, connectivities : indigenous concepts of seasons and change, Victoria River District, NT" in T. Sherratt, T. Griffiths, & L. Robin (eds) A Change in the Weather: Climate and Culture in Australia, National Museum of Australia, Canberra pp, 32-41 Accessed 31 December 2018
 ROSE, Deborah Bird (2005) "An Indigenous Philosophical Ecology: Situating the Human" in The Australian Journal of Anthropology 16(3) pg 294-305Accessed 31 December 2018
 ROSE, Deborah Bird (2005) "Pattern, Connection, Desire: In honour of Gregory Bateson" in  Ecological Humanities, Issue 35, June 2005 Accessed 2 January 2019
 ROSE, Deborah Bird (2012) "Multispecies Knots of Ethical Time" in Environmental Philosophy 9 (1), 127–140Accessed 2 January 2019
 ROSE, Deborah Brid (2013) "Anthropocene Noir" for People and the Planet 2013 Conference: Transforming the Future RMIT University, Melbourne, Australia, 2–4 July Accessed 2 January 2019
 ROSE, Deborah Bird (2013) "Val Plumwood’s Philosophical Animism: attentive interactions in the sentient world" in Environmental Humanities, vol. 3, 2013, pp. 93–109Accessed 2 January 2019

Talks on-line

  ROSE, Deborah Bird (2008) "Indigenous and Western Understandings of Nature" (Part 1) for Australian Catholic University National Lectures June 2008Accessed 2 January 2019
 ROSE, Deborah Bird (2008) "Indigenous and Western Understandings of Nature" (Part 2) for Australian Catholic University National Lectures June 2008 Accessed 2 January 2019
 ROSE, Deborah Bird (2010) "No name. Not in the Face of all this Death' at Society for Cultural Anthropology, Santa Fe, New Mexico, May 7-8, 2010 Accessed 1 January 2019
 ROSE, Deborah Bird (2012) "In the shadow of all this death” at the University of Sydney's Human Animal Research Network's Animal Death Conference, June 12, 2012  Accessed 1 January 2019
 ROSE, Deborah Bird (2013) "Who wrote the book of love" video for  ‘Ecological Australia: Ecocriticism in the Arts’ Symposium, Melbourne 3-4 October  Accessed 2 January 2019
 ROSE, Deborah Bird (2013) "At the Edge of Extinction: Blessings in a Time of Sadness" at the Thinking Extinction symposium, Laurentian University, November 2013 Accessed 2 January 2019
 ROSE, Deborah Bird (2014) "Country and the Gift" at the Sydney Environmental Institute Accessed 2 January 2019
 ROSE, Deborah Bird (2014) “Shimmer: When All You Love is Being Trashed” at Anthropocene: Arts of Living on a Damaged Planet Santa Cruz, California May 8-10, 2014 Accessed 1 January 2019
 ROSE, Deborah Bird (2014) "Kinship and Witness in this Time of Loss" at the Learning to Inherit in Colonized and Ecologically Challenged Lifeworlds Symposium. University of Victoria, Canada in September 2014 Accessed 2 January 2019
 ROSE, Deborah Bird (2014) "Monk Seals at the Edge: Blessings in a Time of Peril" being video conference paper  for UC Davis Conference 'All Things Great and Small' Nov 15-17, 2014  Accessed 2 January 2019

Reports on-line

 ROSE, Deborah (1996) Nourishing Terrains: Australian Aboriginal views of Landscape and Wilderness for Australian Heritage Commission Accessed 25 January 2019
 ROSE, Deborah; JAMES, Diana; & WATSON, Christine (2003) Indigenous kinship with the Natural World in New South Wales. Report to the New South Wales National Parks and Wildlife Service on the relationship between land management and Aboriginal totemism Accessed 2 January 2019
 ROSE, Deborah Bird (2003) Sharing Kinship with Nature: How Reconciliation is Transforming the NSW National Parks and Wildlife Service.  Research undertaken with the NSW National Parks and Wildlife Service’s Cultural Heritage Totemic Landscapes Project Accessed 1 January 2019

1946 births
Date of birth missing
2018 deaths
Place of death missing
University of Delaware alumni
Bryn Mawr College alumni
American ethnographers
American expatriates in Australia
American women anthropologists
20th-century American anthropologists
21st-century American women